The Fiesta Mark IV (internal code name was BE91) was launched in October 1995 and became Britain's best-selling car from 1996 to 1998, when it was overtaken by the all-new Ford Focus, a replacement for the Ford Escort.

Design

The Mark IV benefited from new interior and exterior styling. It maintained similar dimensions to the Mark III along with the platform and the basic body structure, most noticeably the side door openings. The RS1800 and RS Turbo models were not carried over to the updated Fiesta range.

The model featured a range of new Zetec-SE engines, available in 1.25 L and 1.4 L forms; the 1.8 litre diesel engine was slightly modified for the Mark IV, now marketed as the "Endura DE". Lower specification models used what would be the final development of the stalwart "Valencia" engine which had been with the Fiesta since the Mk1 - now known as Endura-E - in both 1.0 L and 1.3 L capacities.

In Brazil a 1.0 litre (Endura Engine) version was available in Popular trim level. Also a 1.3 litre (Endura) and a 1.4 litre 16V (Zetec-SE) was available in CLX trim level; it was sold in Argentina and Chile. The UK trim level line up had relatively few changes over the years: (1995, Encore, LX, Si, Ghia; 1996, Ghia X added as range-topper; 1998, Si replaced by Zetec, petrol LX models briefly renamed Zetec LX, Ghia X models axed; 1999, Finesse added between Encore and Zetec).

In 1997, the Mark IV was introduced in South Africa, the first time the Fiesta had been sold in that market. Only one engine was available, the 1.3 litre Endura E. It subsequently won the South African Car of the Year award. The 1.3 litre engine was replaced with the 1.4 litre PTE (CVH) engine in 1999.

The Mark IV was not sold in North America.

The German-built Ford Puma was based on the Mark IV, sharing its underpinnings. For this reason the 1.7 VCT engine from the Ford Puma has become an extremely popular engine swap into the Mark IV and Mark IV facelift Fiesta. This gives the popular hatchback an extra 100 cc over the previous largest engine size available, variable cam timing and better ratio gearbox while still retaining a factory finish as all components are a direct swap.

Specifications

Facelift

In 1999, the Fiesta received a facelift aimed at giving the car a New Edge look, with a Focus-inspired face, new bumpers and wheel designs. The facelift is sometimes referred to as Mark V in the United Kingdom and elsewhere.

Other changes include 1.6i 16V Zetec engine, fitted to the new Zetec S model, and later available in Ghia and Freestyle trims. New features were made available, such as side airbags and (after launch) the reintroduction of leather trim. An environmentally friendly E-Diesel model was released for 2001, with CO2 emissions of 120 g/km. The Lynx 1.8 TDDi engine was also introduced after launch.

The fourth generation facelift was the last generation of Fiesta to be built at Dagenham in England, and was indeed the final Ford model to be built at Dagenham prior to the closure of the car assembly plant in 2002.  The internal code name of this Fiesta was still BE91. The UK trim level line-up consisted of: 1999, Encore, Finesse, Zetec, LX, Ghia; 2000, Zetec S added; 2001, E-Diesel added at bottom of range. Seeing the production of the fifth generation Fiesta, the Flight and Freestyle trims were respectively replaced by Finesse and Zetec.

In South Africa, the facelift used the Port Elizabeth-built 1.3 L and 1.6 L Rocam engines, instead of the European Sigma 16-valve engines. This model formed the basis of the Ford Ikon (code name C195), which is a four-door saloon designed for India, where Ford was then producing cars in a joint venture with Mahindra. The Ikon was also introduced in other developing countries, such as Brazil (where it is known as the Fiesta Sedan), South Africa, Mexico (where it was called Fiesta Ikon) and China, where saloons are preferred to hatchbacks. They are extremely reliable, and became one of Ford's successes.

There were also four utility variants, the simplest being the "Fiesta Van" which was a three-door hatchback with the rear quarter windows blanked over and the rear seat omitted (in other words, a sedan delivery).

The Fiesta was still Britain's best-selling supermini in 2001, by which time it was making use of a design over a decade old (though heavily updated visually and mechanically). In three-door form, it was sold alongside the fifth generation Fiesta from April to December 2002. In Brazil, it was sold as the Fiesta Street until 2006. This generation was also assembled in China by Changan Ford Mazda in sedan form only from 2003 to 2008 and continued until 2010 by Landwind (a joint venture marque between Changan Automobile and Jiangling Motor Holding) as Landwind CV7, this car was also exported as Changan CV7. There was a version with sporty bumpers sold in China as CV7 Sport with 1.5 L 94bhp petrol engine.

Zetec S

The Zetec S was the highest Fiesta trim, and although its 1.6 L 16v Sigma engine was available in other Fiestas (such as the Freestyle) the Zetec S pushed out , and had major alterations to the suspension, with stiffer anti-roll bars and uprated brakes shared with the Puma.

The fifth generation facelift Zetec S has a sizeable following, with many websites dedicated to the vehicle. There is also a tuning culture devoted to this model, with reputable companies such as Milltek Sport and Shawspeed developing performance parts solely for the Sigma engine.

Zetec S was also offered in South Africa as Fiesta RSi and in Brazil as GLX Sport, both has 1.6 8v Rocam engine. In China, there was a sporty sedan version called Fiesta S.

Specifications:

Mazda 121

As an exercise in badge engineering, the Mazda 121 and Ford Fiesta Mark IV shared their design, were built on the same production lines and used almost all the same parts. At the same time, Mazda also marketed a rebadged first generation Mazda Demio with 121 nameplate in several Asian countries and Australia.

In the JD Power reliability surveys at the time, the Mazda was reported to be significantly more reliable and attracted higher levels of customer satisfaction, despite it being a slower seller than the Fiesta.

It was also sold locally as the Mazda 121 Soho, although it is often referred to simply as the "Mazda Soho".

Derivative models
There were several derivative models based on Fiesta Mark IV, shared the same front to middle sheet metals design and mechanicals.

A van with a boxy rear body and stretched wheelbase used the Courier nameplate and formed the basis of two coupe utility models, one with the short doors of the 5-door hatchback and small quarterlights in the style of larger extended cab pick-ups, made in South Africa as the Ford Bantam; and another with the 3-door's longer doors and no quarter windows, made in Brazil as the Ford Courier.

References

External links 

4th
Cars introduced in 1995

1990s cars

Hatchbacks
Vans